Alessandro Coppola (born 13 March 2000) is an Italian footballer who plays as a defender for Maltese club Birkirkara, on loan from Triestina. With a 2.05 m height, he is the second tallest football player in the world, after Kristof Van Hout.

Club career
On 12 July 2021, he signed with Triestina. On 29 January 2022, he moved on loan to Tsarsko Selo Sofia in Bulgaria until the end of the 2021–22 season.

Club statistics

Club

Notes

References

2000 births
Living people
Footballers from Turin
Italian footballers
Association football defenders
Torino F.C. players
U.S. Livorno 1915 players
S.C. Olhanense players
U.S. Triestina Calcio 1918 players
FC Tsarsko Selo Sofia players
Birkirkara F.C. players
Serie D players
Serie B players
Campeonato de Portugal (league) players
First Professional Football League (Bulgaria) players
Maltese Premier League players
Italian expatriate footballers
Expatriate footballers in Portugal
Italian expatriate sportspeople in Portugal
Expatriate footballers in Bulgaria
Italian expatriate sportspeople in Bulgaria
Expatriate footballers in Malta
Italian expatriate sportspeople in Malta